The San Andreas Fault Observatory at Depth (SAFOD) is a research project that began in 2002 aimed at collecting geological data about the San Andreas Fault for the purpose of predicting and analyzing future earthquakes. The site consists of a  pilot hole and a  main hole. Drilling operations ceased in 2007. Located near the town of Parkfield, California, the project has installed geophone sensors and GPS clocks in a borehole that cuts directly through the fault. This data, along with samples collected during drilling, could shed new light on geochemical and mechanical properties around the fault zone.

SAFOD is part of Earthscope, an Earth science program using geological and geophysical techniques to explore the structure of the North American continent and to understand the origin of earthquakes and volcanoes. Earthscope is funded by the National Science Foundation in conjunction with the U.S. Geological Survey and NASA. Data collected at SAFOD are available from The Northern California Earthquake Data Center at U.C. Berkeley and at the IRIS DMC.

See also
 Chikyū Hakken, deep oceanic drilling program
 Integrated Ocean Drilling Program
 Kola Borehole (1970–2005)
 KTB Borehole (1987–1995)
 Mohorovičić discontinuity
 Project Mohole

References

Further reading

External links
 Earthscope
 SAFOD at ICDP-Online.org

Deepest boreholes
Geology of California
Seismological observatories, organisations and projects
Structure of the Earth